Chicago, Burlington and Quincy 4963 is a preserved class "O-1a" 2-8-2 "Mikado" type steam locomotive originally built by the Baldwin Locomotive Works in 1923 for the Chicago, Burlington and Quincy Railroad. It was used by the CB&Q to haul mainline freight trains before it was leased to the Bevier and Southern Railroad to haul short-distance freight trains in the late 1950s and early 1960s. It was subsequently retained by the CB&Q and used as a source of spare parts before being acquired by Richard Jensen. It was planned for No. 4963 to be restored to run again before it was sold to a scrapyard in Chicago during legal disputes between Jensen and the Chicago and Western Indiana Railroad. No. 4963 was later purchased by the Illinois Railway Museum in 1991, and as of 2023, the locomotive is on static display in Union, Illinois.

History

Design and revenue service 
Between 1917 and 1923, a total of 148 O-1a class 2-8-2 "Mikados" were produced and delivered from the Baldwin Locomotive Works in Eddystone, Pennsylvania, being numbered 5060–5147 and 4940-4999. No. 4963 was among the last locomotives constructed for the railroad in August 1923. All of these locomotives were mainly used for hauling mixed freight trains, mostly around the Iowa division, for over twenty-five years.

As the CB&Q acquired diesel locomotives to modernize the railroad's fleet, most of the O-1a's on the CB&Q, including No. 4963, were reassigned to switch and pull hopper cars of coal within the Beardstown Division in Southern Illinois. In January 1959, No. 4963 was removed from service in the Beardstown Division, and it was put into storage in Galesburg, Illinois. In late 1960, No. 4963 was overhauled inside a roundhouse in Galesburg, and it was loaned to the Bevier and Southern Railroad (B&S) to operate alongside another locomotive the CB&Q loaned to the railroad, fellow O-1a No. 4943. The B&S assigned No. 4963 to pull coal trains between coal mines in Brinkley, Missouri and the B&S-CB&Q interchange in Bevier, Missouri.

Preservation 
In the fall of 1962, No. 4963 was removed from service on the B&S, when the CB&Q loaned an EMD NW2 to the railroad, and the locomotive was returned to Galesburg for storage. At the time, the CB&Q was hosting a steam excursion program, and No. 4963 began serving as a spare parts provider for another fellow O-1a class locomotive, No. 4960. In 1966, the CB&Q’s steam program was discontinued, and all of their remaining steam locomotives were sold off. No. 4963 remained in storage until September 1966, when it was purchased by Richard “Dick” Jensen, who moved it to the Chicago and Western Indiana Railroad’s (C&WI) 47th Street Roundhouse near Dearborn Station in Chicago. Jensen came up with plans to restore No. 4963 to operating condition for use to haul his own excursion trains alongside other steam locomotives he owned, and the locomotive’s tender was to be replaced with a larger one formerly paired with Illinois Central 4-8-2 No. 2612. He relied on a portion of ticket sales from excursion trains hauled by Grand Trunk Western 4-6-2 “Pacific” No. 5629 to fund the restoration.

In 1968 though, ownership of the C&WI changed, and the new owners began to consider demolishing the 47th Street Roundhouse. On February 27, 1969, the C&WI sent Jensen a notice that he had thirty days to vacate his equipment from the property, but subsequent negotiations extended the deadline by three months. While several small things were being removed from the roundhouse, Jensen and his crew desperately searched for a location to store No. 4963, as well as CB&Q 4-8-4 No. 5632 and several boxcars full of tools and spare parts, and considerations came and went to move them to the Illinois Railway Museum.

In August 1969, the C&WI had No. 4963 moved with No. 5632, and the parts-filled boxcars to the nearby 88th street yard. In an effort to find out what the railroad’s intentions were, Jensen had asked both the Chicago and North Western (C&NW) and the Chicago West Pullman and Southern (CWP&S) Railroads if an inspection was being performed on his locomotives and rolling stock to move them, but he was subsequently informed that the C&WI denied his request to inspect his equipment. The following month, on September 25, the C&WI illegally sold No. 4963, No. 5632, and the boxcars to the Erman-Howell division of the Luria Brothers Scrap Company for $5,800, and they were subsequently moved to Erman-Howell’s 83rd street scrapyard. Jensen then tried to repurchase his two CB&Q locomotives from the scrapyard, but his offer was declined.

While No. 5632 was scrapped after derailing on a switch, No. 4963 spent the next twenty-two years being stored inside Erman-Howell’s scrapyard. In March 1991, Jensen passed away from poor health, and his sister, Rita Wied, was put in charge of selling off his remaining equipment items and to resolve his overdue debts. Consequently, Erman-Howell acquired No. 4963 as a compensation, and in the fall of that year, the locomotive became scheduled to be dismantled for scrap. However, a proposition was made to the city of Chicago to acquire No. 4963 and restore it for use in pulling their own excursion trains around the area, but the proposition was declined, and the threat of scrapping returned. The Illinois Railway Museum subsequently reached an agreement with Erman-Howell to trade five Ex-Northwestern Steel and Wire 0-8-0 switchers in exchange for No. 4963. The locomotive was subsequently moved to the Museum’s property in Union, Illinois, where it was cosmetically repainted and put on static display with the rest of the Museum’s collection. As of 2023, No. 4963 is displayed inside one of the Museum’s barns while waiting for further cosmetic work to be performed.

See also 

 Nickel Plate Road 587
 Grand Trunk Western 4070
 Baltimore and Ohio 4500
 St. Louis-San Francisco 1630
 St. Louis–San Francisco 1352

References

Bibliography 

 

Railway locomotives introduced in 1923
Individual locomotives of the United States
2-8-2 locomotives
Chicago, Burlington and Quincy locomotives
Preserved steam locomotives of Illinois
Standard gauge locomotives of the United States
Freight locomotives
Baldwin locomotives